Baron  was an early Japanese admiral of the Imperial Japanese Navy, commanding the IJN 2nd Fleet during the Russo-Japanese War, most notably at the Battle off Ulsan and Tsushima.

Biography
Born to a samurai family in the Satsuma Domain (present-day Kagoshima Prefecture), Kamimura served as a foot soldier during the Boshin War. After the Imperial government was established in 1871, Kamimura became one of the first cadets of the Imperial Japanese Naval Academy, later earning a commission as an ensign following his graduation in 1879.

After the outbreak of the First Sino-Japanese War the following year, Kamimura was given command of the new cruiser , winning distinction at the Battle of the Yalu River on 17 September 1894. In his heyday, he was known throughout Imperial Navy as a gruff and bold combat leader in the old samurai tradition.

In the years following the war, Kamimura held a series of posts in the Navy Ministry as well as staff and fleet commands until his promotion to vice admiral in 1903. He visited Great Britain aboard the battleship  from 1 February 1899 – 22 May 1900, during which time he became a rear admiral.

Placed in command of the IJN 2nd Fleet following the first months of the Russo-Japanese War, Kamimura was ordered to contain the Russian cruiser squadron based in Vladivostok. After the Russians escaped and sank Japanese troopships in the Sea of Japan (April and June 1904), he became the object of widespread popular dissatisfaction, with a mob attacking his Tokyo residence, and newspapers hinting that he should commit suicide. Commanding from the cruiser , Kamimura later led the IJN 2nd Fleet during the Battle of Tsushima on 27 May 1905.

Appointed commander of the Yokosuka Naval Base in 1905, Kamimura was placed in command of the IJN 1st Fleet in 1909. Previously made a danshaku (baron) under the  kazoku peerage system only two years before, Kamimura was made a full admiral on 1 December 1910. Becoming a member of the Supreme War Council the following year, Kamimura entered the reserve list on 1 May 1914, before his death in 1916.

His grave is at the temple of Myōhon-ji in Kamakura.

Promotions
 8 June 1877 – Midshipman (Shoi-Kohosei)
 19 September 1879 – Acting Sub-Lieutenant (Shōi)
 17 December 1881  – Sub-Lieutenant  (Chūi)
 8 April 1884 – Lieutenant (Taii)
 17 September 1890 – Lieutenant-Commander (Shōsa)
 7 December 1894 – Captain (Taisa)
 26 September 1899 – Rear Admiral (Shosho)
 5 September 1903  – Vice Admiral (Chujo)
 1 December 1910 – Admiral (Taisho)

Honours
From the Japanese Wikipedia

Peerages
Baron (21 September 1907)

Decorations
Grand Cordon of the Order of the Sacred Treasure (30 May 1905; Second Class: 27 December 1901; Fourth Class: 25 November 1897; Fifth Class: 24 November 1894; Sixth Class: 22 November 1889)
Order of the Golden Kite, 1st Class (1 April 1906; Fourth Class: 27 September 1895)
Grand Cordon of the Order of the Rising Sun (1 April 1906; Fifth Class: 27 September 1895)
Grand Cordon of the Order of the Rising Sun with Paulownia Flowers (8 August 1930; posthumous)

References

Books

Notes

External links
 Kamimura Hikonojo at the Imperial Japanese Navy website

|-

1849 births
1916 deaths
Imperial Japanese Navy admirals
People from Satsuma Domain
Samurai
Kazoku
People of the Boshin War
Japanese military personnel of the First Sino-Japanese War
Japanese military personnel of the Russo-Japanese War
People of Meiji-period Japan
Shimazu retainers
Recipients of the Order of the Rising Sun
Recipients of the Order of the Golden Kite